The 2001 Skate Canada International was the second event of six in the 2001–02 ISU Grand Prix of Figure Skating, a senior-level international invitational competition series. It was held at the Credit Union Centre in Saskatoon, Saskatchewan on November 1–4. Medals were awarded in the disciplines of men's singles, ladies' singles, pair skating, and ice dancing. Skaters earned points toward qualifying for the 2001–02 Grand Prix Final.

Results

Men

Ladies

Pairs

Ice dancing

External links
 2001 Skate Canada International
 https://web.archive.org/web/20120324011242/http://ww2.isu.org/news/gpskcan.html
 https://web.archive.org/web/20120324011237/http://ww2.isu.org/news/gpskcan1.html
 https://web.archive.org/web/20120324011251/http://ww2.isu.org/news/gpskcan2.html
 https://web.archive.org/web/20120324011302/http://ww2.isu.org/news/gpskcan3.html
 https://web.archive.org/web/20120324011333/http://ww2.isu.org/news/gpskcan4.html

Skate Canada International, 2001
Skate Canada International
2001 in Canadian sports 
2001 in Saskatchewan